is a Japanese football player who plays for Okinawa SV.

Career
In February 2019, Takayanagi joined Okinawa SV.

Club statistics
Updated to 23 February 2017.

References

External links

Profile at Gainare Tottori

1994 births
Living people
Sportspeople from Ulsan
Japanese footballers
J3 League players
Gainare Tottori players
Vonds Ichihara players
FC Ryukyu players
Okinawa SV players
Association football forwards